Katherine "Kate" Orme (born 14 April 1989) is an Australian rules footballer who plays for West Coast in the AFL Women's (AFLW). Orme was delisted by the Eagles on 9 June 2021, after playing 7 games with the team throughout her career.

Kate is an ambassador for the National Asthma Council of Australia and for Asthma WA.

References

External links

 

Living people
1989 births
West Coast Eagles (AFLW) players
Australian rules footballers from Western Australia
Sportswomen from Western Australia